Vitebsk State Technological University (VSTU) is a technological university  located in Vitebsk, Belarus.

References

External links
 

Universities in Belarus
Buildings and structures in Vitebsk
Universities and institutes established in the Soviet Union
Educational institutions established in 1965
1965 establishments in the Soviet Union